Antennablennius ceylonensis is a species of combtooth blenny found in the Indian ocean, around Sri Lanka.

References

ceylonensis
Taxa named by Hans Bath
Fish described in 1983